Florence Ifeoluwa Otedola (born 11 November 1992), professionally known as DJ Cuppy, or simply Cuppy, is a Nigerian disc jockey and producer. She is the daughter of Nigerian businessman Femi Otedola. She grew up in Lagos and moved to London at the age of 13.

Early life and education
Cuppy lived in Ilupeju for six years before moving to Ikeja where she attended Grange School, Ikeja. She then relocated to London for her GCSEs and A-Levels. She graduated from King's College London in July 2014, with a degree in business and economics. She also earned a master's degree in music business from New York University in 2015. As from October 2021, Cuppy is enrolled and pursuing a master's degree in African Studies at the University of Oxford.

Career
In 2014 Cuppy was the resident DJ at the MTV Africa Music Awards in Durban. She then played at the Tatler and Christie's Art Ball in London, and at the Financial Times Business of Luxury Summit in Mexico City.

In July 2014, she released House of Cuppy as her first compilation mix in London and Lagos, before launching it in New York on 2 September 2014.  With House of Cuppy, she produced EDM-esque remixes of songs by leading afropop artists.

That same year, Cuppy also launched the London-based music management and content production business, Red Velvet Music Group.

In January 2015, Cuppy was featured on the cover of the Guardian Life magazine. The cover celebrated a new generation of African women. In March 2015, Cuppy was named the official DJ for the 2015 Oil Barons Charity in Dubai, and became the first African act to perform at the event. She was featured in the 2015 April/May issue of Forbes Woman Africa.

In June 2015, Cuppy released House of Cuppy II.

In August 2015, Cuppy set off on her first DJ tour to 8 countries in Africa, titled “Cuppy Takes Africa”. She visited Nigeria, Senegal, Ghana, Kenya, Tanzania, Rwanda, Uganda and South Africa. The “Cuppy Takes Africa” tour included performances, major artist collaborations, and charitable engagements supported by GTB Bank and the Dangote Foundation. Later that year, she interned at Jay-Z's Roc Nation.

In October 2016, the "Cuppy Takes Africa" tour aired on Fox Life Africa as an 8-episode documentary series. In 2016, Cuppy was the resident DJ for MTV2's Uncommon Sense with Charlamagne Tha God.

She produced two songs, "Vibe" and "The way I am", which appeared on the "Afrobeats" EP by Young Paris which as released on 24 March 2017.

On 13 October 2017, she released "Green Light", her first official single. The song features guest vocals from Nigerian singer and producer Tekno.

On 30 March 2018, she released "Vybe", her second official single. The song features guest vocals from Ghanaian rapper Sarkodie.

On 24 August 2018, she released Currency, her third official single featuring L.A.X.

On 5 October 2018, she released Werk, her fourth single featuring Skuki.

On 19 April 2019, she collaborated with Kwesi Arthur for her fifth single Abena

On 16 August 2019,  she released Gelato, here sixth single featuring Zlatan.

In 2020, Cuppy was inducted into the Forbes Magazine's 30 under 30 class.

On 28 May 2020, she became the host of ‘Africa Now Radio’ on Apple Music Beats 1

On 16 July 2020, she released Jollof On The Jet, her seventh single featuring Rema & Rayvanny.

On 24 August 2020, she unveiled her debut album Original Copy.

In February 2021, she partnered with Apple Music to launch their first radio show in Africa.

In September 2021, Cuppy was announced as one of the cast members for the Channel 4 reality TV show High Life, a show focussing on the careers of British West Africans.

From January until August 2022, Cuppy hosted the Sunday version of BBC Radio 1Xtra's breakfast show with the Saturday one hosted by Swarzy formerly of Kiss Radio. They both replaced Remi Burgz, who went on to replace Yasmin Evans on 1Xtra's weekday lunchtime show.

Artistry
In an interview with Tush Magazine, Cuppy described her sound as "Neo-Afrobeats", which is a fusion of Electro house and Afrobeats.

Personal life

Veganism 
On 14 April 2020, DJ Cuppy revealed on Twitter that she was a vegan. 
Lately, Cuppy who during the COVID-19 period received a special gift of a Ferrari Portofino worth ₦80M from her father, also announced that she is now a house owner in the United Kingdom, London which she named PinkPentHouse. She made it public on 8 April 2021. This received a lot of reactions on social media and was featured on MTV Cribs.

Relationships 
In November 2022, Cuppy got engaged on stage to Youtuber/BMX Rider Ryan Taylor. The pair have since married and live together in Dubai.

Philanthropy 
In July 2018, Cuppy launched the Cuppy Foundation. The following year (November 2019), the foundation organized the Gold Gala and raised over N5bn for the Save the Children initiative Nigeria. Nigerian business Dangote and her father donated to the cause.

Ambassadorship
In April 2014, Cuppy was appointed by Nigeria's Minister of Tourism, Culture and National Orientation (Edem Duke) as the tourism ambassador for the country's "Fascinating Nigeria" campaign. Cuppy became one of Pepsi's DJ ambassadors alongside 3 others in Nigeria.

On 20 March 2018, Cuppy was announced as an Official DJ Ambassador for Pepsi. She appeared in Pepsi's "#NaijaAllTheWay" all star commercial ahead of the 2018 World Cup.

On 5 June 2018, Cuppy was announced as a Global Citizen Education Ambassador.

On 28 November 2018, Cuppy was announced as an Ambassador For Save The Children UK.

On 28 July 2021, Cuppy was announced as an Ambassador for Lagos SDGs Youth Alliance.

Discography

Album

Singles

See also 
List of Nigerian DJs
List of Yoruba people

References
53. Joshpedia (2022) DJ Cuppy Net worth and Biography

External links
 

BBC Radio 1Xtra presenters
Nigerian record producers
Nigerian DJs
Nigerian women musicians
21st-century Nigerian musicians
Living people
Musicians from Lagos
Alumni of King's College London
New York University alumni
Nigerian expatriates in England
Otedola family
Yoruba women musicians
1992 births
21st-century women musicians
Nigerian women record producers
Nigerian radio presenters
Nigerian women radio presenters